San Pedro Yólox is a town and municipality in Oaxaca in south-western Mexico. 
It is part of the Ixtlán District in the Sierra Norte region.

References

Municipalities of Oaxaca